Get Color is the second studio album by American electronic noise rock band Health. It was released on Lovepump United on September 8, 2009. It received generally favorable reviews from critics. It peaked at number 17 on the Billboard Heatseekers Albums chart, as well as number 43 on the Independent Albums chart. As of 2015, it has sold 11,000 copies.

Critical reception

At Metacritic, which assigns a weighted average score out of 100 to reviews from mainstream critics, the album received an average score of 79, based on 18 reviews, indicating "generally favorable reviews".

Jason Lymangrover of AllMusic gave the album 4 stars out of 5, saying, "As well as being larger, the aspect that separates Get Color from the band's debut of fractured near-instrumentals is that the tracks on board actually feel like fully realized songs, rather than sketched ideas." Joe Colly of Pitchfork gave the album a 7.4 out of 10, commenting that "if HEALTH can continue to find some deeper meaning behind their very impressive musicianship, they might be onto something great."

Track listing

Personnel
Credits adapted from liner notes.

 Health – performance, production, engineering, mixing
 Manny Nieto – co-production, engineering, mixing
 Shane Smith – additional engineering
 Jake Friedman – executive production
 Nick Zampiello – mastering
 Rob Gonnella – mastering

Charts

References

External links
 

2009 albums
Health (band) albums
Lovepump United albums